In Too Deep is a 1989 erotic thriller film.

Production
The film was raised through private investment including the producers own money. Two weeks into the five-week shoot a major investor pulled out but they managed to complete the film. It was shot under the title Mack the Knife.

John Tatoulis later stated:
I was interested in two things in In Too Deep: one was the corruption of innocents and the other was the strengths and weaknesses of sexuality. And I wanted to set it in an urban landscape. What I was really keen to do was create a mood and a feel through a variety of ways. I believe that film is like a tapestry and all the components that go to making the texture of that tapestry are all important: sound, pictures, editing, performances, direction. If one doesn't work, then the final tapestry won't have the texture the director had in his or her mind to start with. If a film doesn't have a feeling, a feeling that has a texture to it, then it's lacking. So that was something I was very keen to explore: how do I give this film a feeling of claustrophobia, a feeling of heat, a feeling of menace and vulnerability.

Release
Despite the film's low budget it managed to be widely seen around the world on video.

References

External links

In Too Deep at Oz Movies

1980s erotic thriller films
1989 films
Australian erotic thriller films
Films directed by John Tatoulis
Films produced by Colin South
Films produced by John Tatoulis
1980s English-language films
1980s Australian films